Ibrahim Helal Shehata (born February 28, 1990) is an Egyptian professional footballer who currently plays as a defensive midfielder for the Egyptian club El Raja SC. In 2014, Helal signed a 2-year contract for Alexandria's club Al Ittihad in a free transfer from Wadi Degla, he then asked to leave the club since he felt ignorance. He then moved to Marsa Matruh's club El Raja SC.

References

External links
 

1990 births
Living people
El Raja SC players
Egyptian footballers
Association football midfielders
Wadi Degla SC players
Al Ittihad Alexandria Club players